Simat-Ea (Me-Ea, reading uncertain) was a concubine of Shulgi, second king of the Third Dynasty of Ur. She appears in several texts of the period, but her exact position is unknown. She was most likely a concubine of the king, but it is also possible that she was his daughter. Simat-Ea appears in several lists of royal women where these women received goods or animals. The other women in these lists are queens or concubines known from other sources providing the impression that Simat-Ea was concubine or queen too. The lists do only provide the name of these women, not the titles.

References

Literature 

21st-century BC people
21st-century BC women
Third Dynasty of Ur